Bruce McNish is a former New Zealand international lawn bowler.

Bowls career
McNish won a bronze medal at the 1994 Commonwealth Games in the fours event in Victoria, British Columbia, Canada with Stewart Buttar, Peter Belliss and Rowan Brassey.

He won the 1994 pairs title and the 1983, 1988, 1993, 1994 and 2008 fours titles at the New Zealand National Bowls Championships bowling for various clubs.

References

New Zealand male bowls players
Living people
Commonwealth Games medallists in lawn bowls
Commonwealth Games bronze medallists for New Zealand
Bowls players at the 1994 Commonwealth Games
Year of birth missing (living people)
20th-century New Zealand people
Medallists at the 1994 Commonwealth Games